Jai Simha is a 2018 Indian Telugu-language action film produced by C. Kalyan on C. K. Entertainments banner and directed by K. S. Ravikumar. It stars Nandamuri Balakrishna, Nayanthara, Hariprriya, Natasha Doshi and music was composed by Chirantan Bhatt. The film was a box office Hit.

Plot 
The film starts with Narasimha (Nandamuri Balakrishna) traveling across Karnataka, Kerala looking for peace with his son, and ends up in Tamil Nadu after finding the places not suitable for raising his son. In Kumbakonam, he visits the temple on Rathasapthami day looking for a job. The priest is unintentionally touched by the baby, who picks up a discussion with Narasimha, and it is ended by the temple secretary Dharmakarta (Murali Mohan). Dharmakarta then offers a job to Narasimha at his house as a driver. There are around 12 workers in the house including Raju Reddy (Brahmanandam), and his wife (Priya). Meanwhile, the city kingpin Kaniyappan (Prabhakar) meets up with the ACP (Kartar Cheema) who is sincere yet corrupt and arrogant. One day, Dharamkarta's daughter Dhanya (Natasha Doshi) drives home taking drugs and catches Narasimha's attention. The next day, Kaniyappan and his men create a ruckus explaining that the car that Dhanya drove last night caused an accident and his brother was the victim and he is out for vengeance. Narasimha takes the blame and gets beaten up, which makes Dhanya fall for him.

Meanwhile, Central Minister JP (Jaya Prakash Reddy) visits the temple and insults the chief priest (L. B. Sriram), where the ACP raises a hand against him. This results in a Brahmin agitation, where they demand an apology from the ACP. Narasimha enters the scene with the secretary and resolves it. This is telecast by the media and is attended by the main villain Thota Rami Reddy (Ashutosh Rana). Meanwhile, the ACP, being humiliated, tries to create a feud between Kaniyappan and Narasimha by killing the latter's brother. Kaniyappan, upon learning the truth, sends his men to bring the son of ACP, who is a lookalike of Narasimha's son. Thinking his son is at risk, Narasimha unleashes his other side on the villains, rescuing the baby, only to learn that the ACP is the father and that Gauri (Nayanthara) is the mother. The next day, Narasimha warns Kaniyappan, and being confronted by Dhanya, he reveals his past.

Narasimha is an orphan befriended by Gauri at school. She is the daughter of the school headmaster (Prakash Raj). Narasimha is debarred from school after he picks up a fight. He grows up and has his mechanic shed along with doing justice in the city. Along with that, the love between Gauri and Narasimha increases. One day while passing the traffic, Narasimha encounters Rami Reddy's son holding up traffic for his MP seat. This results in the death of a labored woman, and Narasimha teaches him a lesson without allowing him to attend his nomination. This results in humiliation by JP, who offers his daughter's hand. Losing prestige, the son commits suicide, which enrages Rami Reddy, who takes revenge by stopping the marriage of one of Narasimha's associates, Manga (Hariprriya). Narasimha brings him to justice and is given a death sentence by the judge (K. S. Ravikumar). Meanwhile, Gauri forces Narasimha to marry her and talk to her father, who recognizes him and says that his ways would not suit his daughter's. Out of respect for his master, Narasimha sacrifices his love. However, Gauri takes it seriously and escapes and makes it to his shed to marry him secretly.

Understanding the whole situation, Narasimha gets back to the shed by marrying Manga. The actual twist in the tale happens now, when Narasimha and the couple have twins, with Manga dead after giving birth. On the other side, Gauri loses her son during pregnancy. Unable to hear his Master's pain, Narasimha gives one son to her and leaves with the other, and ends up in Kumbakonam. Back in the present, Rami Reddy escapes with his goons while going to court and unites with Kaniyappan to kill Narasimha. Kidnapping the ACP couple lures Narasimha into the dockyard. Narasimha bashes up everyone and kills Kaniyappan before hanging Rami Reddy, but during a shootout, the ACP couple is wounded along with their son. The doctors can save the couple but not the baby as the bullet had hit the baby's head. Unable to bear the truth, once again the master laments, which makes Narasimha give away the other baby and walk away with the dead baby's corpse, assuring the master that he will be there whenever the couple is in danger.

Cast

Nandamuri Balakrishna as Narasimha 
Nayanthara as Gauri, Master's daughter
Haripriya as Mangala, Narasimha's wife
Natasha Doshi as Dhanya, Murali Krishna's daughter
Prakash Raj as Master
Ashutosh Rana as Thota Rami Reddy
Brahmanandam as Santhanam
K. S. Ravikumar as Judge
Murali Mohan as Dharmakarta
Prabhakar as Kaniyappan
Jaya Prakash Reddy as Central Minister Veera Raghava Reddy
Chalapathi Rao as MP
Sivaji Raja as Ranga
Pavithra Lokesh as Vasantha, Thota Rami Reddy's wife
Priya as Raju Reddy's wife
Sandhya Janak as Dharmakarta's wife
L. B. Sriram as Chief Priest 
Kartar Cheema as ACP Ravi Shanker
Ravi Prakash as Shaam
Duvvasi Mohan
Chatrapathi Sekhar
 Sekhar Varma as Ravi Shankar Reddy, Rami Reddy's son

Reception 
The film received mixed to positive reviews. 123 telugu.com gave  it 3 / 5 stars saying " Balakrishna is the biggest asset of the film. It is purely a film made to elevate Balakrishna and his character Narasimha ".  The Hindu gave a more favourable review and said  that the film "gives a good contemporary action spin to an emotional story".

Soundtrack

Music was composed by Chirantan Bhatt. Music released by Aditya Music Company. The audio function was held on 24 December 2017 at Vijayawada by Nara Lokesh, Cabinet Minister of A.P.

References

External links 

2018 masala films
2010s Telugu-language films
2018 action drama films
2018 films
Films directed by K. S. Ravikumar
Indian action drama films